Carry Me On is the first single by Brookes Brothers from their second album, Orange Lane, released on Viper Recordings, the song featured vocal from Chrom3. It debuted on the UK Singles Chart at number 71 on 11 August 2013.

On 23 May 2013, the song was selected as Zane Lowe's Hottest Record in the World.

Track listing

Chart performance

Weekly charts

References

2013 singles
Brookes Brothers songs
2013 songs